Hajde da se volimo ( Let's Fall in Love) is a Yugoslav musical comedy film series consisting of three feature-length films released between 1987 and 1990.

Hajde da se volimo (1987)
Film release and plot
Hajde da se volimo was first released in Yugoslavia on Friday, 20 November 1987. It is a musical comedy starring Lepa Brena and her band Slatki Greh.

Soundtrack
The star of the film, Lepa Brena, sings the film's soundtrack of the same name Hajde da se volimo with her band Slatki Greh. The soundtrack album features ten original songs that were used throughout the film. The scenes in which the songs "Sanjam" (Dreaming), "Hajde da se volimo" (Let's Fall in Love), Udri, Mujo (Hit It, Mujo), "Učenici" (Students), "Golube" (Dove), "Suze brišu sve" (Tears Erase Everything) and "Zbog tebe" (Because of You) are played were used as their music videos. The film Hajde da se volimo begins with Brena singing "Evo, zima će" (Winter's Coming).

Apart from the soundtrack, Serbian composer Kornelije Kovač composed additional music throughout the film.

Filming locations
The movie was filmed across the former Yugoslavia, including:
Dubrovnik, Croatia
Užice, Serbia
Kosjerić, Serbia
Stari Most in Mostar, Bosnia and Herzegovina

Cast
Lepa Brena - Lepa Brena
Bata Živojinović - Komandir Milanović
Dragomir "Gidra" Bojanić - Šofer Gile
Mima Karadžić - Menadžer Svetislav
Svetislav Goncić - Bale
Miodrag Andrić - Milicioner Milivoje
Kole Angelovski - Milicioner Gaga
Milan Štrljić - Šef bande
Boro Stjepanović - Komandirov pomoćnik
Saša Popović - Saša
Dušan Trifunčević - Dule
Branislav Mijatović - Bane
Ljubiša Marković - Ljubiša
Živojin Matić - Žile
Zoran Radanov - Zoki
Danica Maksimović - Šefica recepcije
Tatjana Pujin - Tanja
Mihajlo Viktorović - Tanjin otac
Mladen Nedeljković - Tanjin brat
Radoslava Marinković - Službenica u hotelu
Aleksandra Petković - Mlada seljanka
Milan Srdoč - Čika Milija
Predrag Milinković - Otmičar I
Dragomir Stanojević - Otmičar II
Žika Milenković - Poslovni tip I
Nenad Ciganović - Poslovni tip II
Božidar Pavičević-Longa - Poslovni tip III
Bata Paskaljević - Upravnik hotela
Zoran Stojiljković - Glavni gangster
Đorđe Jovanović - Šef mesne zajednice
Nikola Milić - Deda Vukašin
Ratko Sarić - Deda Radovan
Dragomir Čumić

Director
Aleksandar Đorđević

Writer
Jovan Marković

Executive producer
Radoslav Raka Đokić

Producer
Milan Božić

Hajde da se volimo 2: Još jednom (1989)
 

Film release and plot
Hajde da se volimo 2 was released across Yugoslavia on Tuesday, 17 October 1989, nearly two years after the first film.

Filming locations
Some of the scenes in the movie were filmed on the island of Lopud, which is one of the Elaphiti Islands.

Cast

Director
Stanko Crnobrnja

Writer
Jovan Marković

Executive producer
Milija Gane Đokić

Producer
Radoslav Raka Đokić

Hajde da se volimo 3: Udaje se Lepa Brena (1990)
 

Film release
Hajde da se volimo 3 was released across Yugoslavia on Monday, 19 November 1990.

Plot
The false story in the newspaper about the marriage of Lepa Brena to a wealthy Australian, they will try to take advantage of various types to check the news and to get a good salary and a bet that even some fairly well and get rich.

Filming locations
The movie was filmed mostly in the different parts of Serbia and Montenegro:
Budva, Montenegro
Žabljak, Montenegro
Belgrade, Serbia
Tara, a river in Montenegro
Sveti Stefan, Montenegrin islet
Crno jezero, Black Lake of Montenegro
Kopaonik, mountain in Serbia
Durmitor
Tivat Airport, Montenegrin airport
Vršac International Airport, Serbian airport

Cast

Director
Stanko Crnobrnja

Writer
Radoslav Pavlović

Executive producer
Radoslav Raka Đokić

Possible fourth film
The possibility of a fourth film has been thrown around for years.

Lepa Brena was quoted in January 2013 as saying about the fourth film: "To me it's all a matter of willpower to create a story called Let's Fall in Love, Part 4. I'm waiting to finish a lot of stuff to get started on that film. A movie costs between one million and two million to make. The funds should be provided, as well as good actors, a good script and good music. I can say for now I really have the desire to do it."

References

External links

1987 films
1989 films
1990 films
1980s musical comedy films
Yugoslav musical comedy films
Serbo-Croatian-language films
Bosnian-language films
Croatian-language films
Serbian-language films
Montenegrin-language films
Films set in Serbia
Films set in Belgrade
Cultural depictions of Lepa Brena
1987 comedy films
1989 comedy films
Films shot in Belgrade
Films shot in Serbia